Astroblepus orientalis is a species of catfish of the family Astroblepidae. It can be found on Lake Maracaibo in Venezuela.

References

Bibliography
Eschmeyer, William N., ed. 1998. Catalog of Fishes. Special Publication of the Center for Biodiversity Research and Information, num. 1, vol. 1–3. California Academy of Sciences. San Francisco, California, United States. 2905. .

Astroblepus
Fish described in 1903
Fish of Venezuela